Siri Chand Ram (born 26 January 1958), known as Chand Ram Bairagi, is a former Indian athlete who won gold medal at 1982 Asian Games at Delhi in 20 kilometre road walk event. He also represented India at the 1984 Olympics. He was presented the Arjuna Award and the Padma Shri.

Awards
 1982: Arjuna Award in Athletics
 1983: Padma Shri

References

External links
 

Living people
1958 births
Athletes from Haryana
Indian male racewalkers
Olympic athletes of India
Athletes (track and field) at the 1984 Summer Olympics
Asian Games gold medalists for India
Asian Games bronze medalists for India
Asian Games medalists in athletics (track and field)
Athletes (track and field) at the 1982 Asian Games
Athletes (track and field) at the 1986 Asian Games
Commonwealth Games competitors for India
Athletes (track and field) at the 1982 Commonwealth Games
Recipients of the Arjuna Award
Recipients of the Padma Shri in sports
Medalists at the 1982 Asian Games
Medalists at the 1986 Asian Games